Temple Israel is the oldest of eleven Progressive synagogues in South Africa. It is a provincial heritage site, built in the Art Deco style by architect Hermann Kallenbach. It is located in the Johannesburg suburb of Hillbrow. It is an affiliate of the South African Union for Progressive Judaism (SAUPJ), which is part of the World Union for Progressive Judaism (WUPJ).

Temple Israel officially opened on August 23, 1936, as the mother synagogue of Progressive Judaism in the country. Johannesburg mayor Maurice Freeman, a member of the Jewish community, laid the cornerstone on September 22, 1935. The founding rabbi was Moses Cyrus Weiler.

Progressive Judaism 
The progressive streams of Judaism began during the Enlightenment in 18th-century Europe, and was brought to South Africa in the 1930s by Jews fleeing persecution in Central and Eastern Europe. Progressive Judaism aims to strike a balance between modernity and tradition. Progressive Judaism has given prominence to the moral commands over the ritual observances. This is not to abandon rituals altogether, but to highlight that by themselves they are insufficient unless they are accompanied by ethical conduct. This means that the movement is supportive of egalitarian seating and female participation in services, support for LGBT rights and flexibility over Kashrut dietary laws. It is one of four Progressive, the others being Beit Emanuel Progressive Synagogue on Oxford Road, Temple Bet David in Sandton and Beit Luria (opened in 2019) in Randburg. The Progressive movement in South Africa and the overall South African Jewish population reached its high point in the 1970s with an estimated Jewish population of 120 000 of whom 11 000 identified with the Progressive movement. Today the Jewish population is estimated at 70 000 with around 6 000 Progressive Jews.

History  
Temple Israel was built in 1936 on the corner of Claim and Paul Nel Streets when the Jewish population of Hillbrow  amounted to around 800. The interior maintains much of the original features such as wood panelling and parquet floors. The bimah has twin gold columns and menorah shapes going up the wall. There is also an egalitarian three-sided gallery that runs around the main seating area.

The idea to build the synagogue was sparked by a visit in 1929 of Prof. Abraham Zvi Idelsohn (1882-1938) who was visiting family in Johannesburg at the time. He held forth on Jewish music and the origins of Progressive Judaism, as Reform was also called. Idelsohn encouraged his brother Jerry to found a Reform group in the Gold City. After beginning to hold services in private homes in 1930, Jerry founded the South African Jewish Religious Union for Liberal Judaism (later the South African Union for Progressive Judaism (SAUPJ)). Jerry made contact with Moses Cyrus Weiler, at the time a student of the elder Idelsohn's at the Hebrew Union College-Jewish Institute of Religion. After he was ordained in August 1933, Rabbi Weiler came to Johannesburg to found a Reform congregation. His first service was held in the Freemason's Hall at Clarendon Place at the edge of Hillbrow.

At the end of 1933, a plot of 3/4 of an acre was purchased, and three years later, the synagogue officially opened. The imposing building was designed in Art Deco style and is four stories high. It was designed by the Jewish architect Hermann Kallenbach with his partners A.M. Kennedy and A.S. Furner. Kallenbach also designed the equally striking Greek Orthodox Church on Wolmarans Street and Jeppestown Reformed Church in Fairview. He also helped choose the site for the Great Synagogue on Wolmarans Street.

On 6 August 1983 a limpet mine exploded outside the synagogue, four hours before State President Marais Viljoen was scheduled to attend a ceremony marking Temple Israel's 50th anniversary. There were no injuries and the celebration went ahead with Viljoen in attendance. Mahommed Iqbal Shaik of the Dolphin Unit of Umkhonto we Sizwe (MK) later assumed responsibility during the Truth and Reconciliation Commission hearings and he was granted amnesty.

Jews began emigrating from South Africa in the 1980s. At Temple Israel's 80th anniversary celebration in 2016, a permanent exhibition was launched delving into the evolution of the Reformed Movement in South Africa and the history of the synagogue, the Heritage Centre. In 2017, only 50 attended regularly, although 300 attended on High Holy Days.

Activities 
The congregation consists primarily of old, frail, lonely and poor people from Hillbrow, Berea, Yeoville, and Parktown. These Jews still regard it as their spiritual home. The synagogue is leased to a Christian church for Sunday services, at a nominal fee.

Temple Israel's site houses a school that enrolls Jews and non-Jewish students. The shul has established an outreach program, the M.C. Weiler Primary School, in Alexandra township. The women of Temple Israel began such programs in 1944, believing that Jews must help fellow both believers and their other neighbors in need.

Businesswoman Reeva Forman got involved with Temple Israel in the early 1990s when she heard the congregation was going to sell the synagogue. The purchase vote failed by one. She has served as chairwoman of Temple Israel since 1994.

References

External links 
 Official website history page.
 South African Virtual Jewish History Tour. URL accessed 15 November 2017.

Buildings and structures in Johannesburg
Synagogues in South Africa
Art Deco synagogues
Hermann Kallenbach buildings
Jews and Judaism in Johannesburg
Progressive Judaism in South Africa
Synagogues completed in 1936
1936 establishments in South Africa
20th-century religious buildings and structures in South Africa